Olga Viktorovna Nazarova (born in Omsk on ) is a Russian-born Belarusian biathlete.

Nazarova competed in the 2002,2006 and 2010 Winter Olympics for Belarus. Her best finish was 4th, as part of the 2006 Belarusian women's relay team. Her best individual placing was 6th, in the individual and the mass start. In 2002, she also finished 14th in the sprint, 11th in the pursuit and 7th with the relay team. In 2006, she also finished 8th in the sprint, and 7th in the pursuit and individual. In 2010, she finished 74th in the sprint.

As of February 2013, Nazarova has won one medal at the Biathlon World Championships, a bronze with the Belarusian women's relay team, in 2005. Her best individual result at the Biathlon World Championships is 9th, in the 2009 sprint.

As of February 2013, Nazarova has won eight Biathlon World Cup medals. This includes two individual medals, both bronze in mass start events at Holmenkollen in 2002/03 and 2005/06. She also has two gold medals, won in the women's relay with Belarus at Brezno in 2002/03 and Hochfilzen in 2003/04. Her best overall finish in the Biathlon World Cup is 13th, in 2008/09.

World Cup Podiums

References

External links
 

1977 births
Biathletes at the 2002 Winter Olympics
Biathletes at the 2006 Winter Olympics
Biathletes at the 2010 Winter Olympics
Belarusian female biathletes
Russian female biathletes
Living people
Olympic biathletes of Belarus
Sportspeople from Omsk
Biathlon World Championships medalists
Universiade silver medalists for Belarus
Universiade bronze medalists for Belarus
Universiade medalists in biathlon
Competitors at the 2001 Winter Universiade
Competitors at the 2003 Winter Universiade